This is a list of areas in the Metropolitan Borough of Sandwell, West Midlands, England.

 Balls Hill
 Bearwood
 Black Lake
 Black Patch
 Bloomfield
 Brades Village
 Brandhall
 Brickhouse Farm
 Bristnall Fields
 Burnt Tree
 Causeway Green
 Charlemont
 Cherry Orchard
 Church Hill
 Churchfield
 Cock Green
 Cradley Heath
 The Cronefields
 Darby's Hill
 Dudley Port
 Fallings Heath, Wednesbury
 Friar Park
 Golds Green
 Grace Mary Estate
 Great Barr
 Great Bridge
 Greets Green
 Grove Vale
 Guns Village
 Haden Cross
 Hall End, West Bromwich
 Hall Green
 Hampstead
 Harvills Hawthorn
 Hateley Heath
 Hill Top
 Hill Top, Oldbury
 Horsley Heath
 King's Hill, Wednesbury
 Lambert's End
 Langley
 Langley Green
 Londonderry
 Lyndon, West Bromwich
 Mayers Green
 Mesty Croft
 Mouse Sweet
 Newton
 New Town
 Oakham
 Ocker Hill
 Oldbury
 Old Hill
 Portway
 Princes End
 Rood End
 Round's Green
 Rowley Regis
 Sandwell
 Smethwick
 Soho
 Springfield
 Stone Cross, West Bromwich
 Summer Hill
 Swan Village
 Tat Bank
 The Knowle
 Tibbington
 Tippity Green
 Tipton
 Tipton Green
 Titford
 Tividale
 Tividale Hall
 Toll End
 Turner's Hill
 Vicarage, Wednesbury
 Warley Woods
 Wednesbury
 Wednesbury Oak
 West Bromwich
 West Smethwick
 Whiteheath Gate
 Wood Green, Wednesbury
 The Woods
 Yew Tree

Lists of places in England
Areas
Towns in the West Midlands (county)
West Midlands (county)-related lists